Yaroslav Catraio João de Aguiar, nicknamed Jaro, (born 11 June 1985) is an Angolan handball player for Interclube and the Angolan national team.

He participated at the 2017 World Men's Handball Championship.

References

1985 births
Living people
Angolan male handball players